Ma Qiang (born May 1956) is a Chinese diplomat who served as Chinese Ambassador to South Sudan from 2013 to 2016.

Life and career
Ma was born in May 1956. He graduated from Beijing Language and Culture University in 1982.

In July 2013, 12th Standing Committee of the National People's Congress appointed him the Chinese Ambassador to South Sudan, succeeding Li Zhiguo.

References

1956 births
Beijing Language and Culture University alumni
Living people
Ambassadors of China to South Sudan